John Vaughan, 3rd Earl of Lisburne (3 May 1769 – 18 May 1831), known as the Honourable John Vaughan until 1820, was a British soldier and Member of Parliament for Cardigan Boroughs.

Lisburne was the younger son of Wilmot Vaughan, 1st Earl of Lisburne. He served in the Army, transferring from the 87th Foot to the 58th Foot as a captain in 1795, and being promoted to major the next month and lieutenant-colonel later the same year. He eventually achieved the rank of colonel.

Political career
In 1795, he sought election to the House of Commons for Berwick but withdrew when he faced a contest that the family could not afford. In the following year, Vaughan's father gave up the Cardiganshire county seat to Thomas Johnes, who had been his ally in county politics since 1774. As part of this arrangement, Vaughan was elected unopposed for the Cardigan Boroughs constituency.

In 1812, he was opposed by Herbert Evans of Higmead, who was supported by several landed families. Vaughan won by eighty votes but immediately after the result was announced, Evans alleged that the return was irregular and illegal.

By the end of his parliamentary career, Vaughan was heavily in debt. In 1816, Pryse Pryse of Gogerddan withdrew from a contest for the Cardiganshire county constituency on the understanding that he would receive support as a candidate for the seat of the borough at the next election. When an election was called two years later, Vaughan withdrew rather than face a contest. To compound matters he also failed to obtain the post of Lord Lieutenant of Cardiganshire.

Personal life
On 6 May 1820, Vaughan succeeded his half-brother in the earldom. But as this was an Irish peerage it did not entitle him to a seat in the House of Lords.

Lord Lisburne married Lucy, daughter of William Courtenay, 2nd Viscount Courtenay, in 1798. He died in May 1831, aged 62, and was succeeded in his titles by his son Ernest.

References

Sources
Kidd, Charles, Williamson, David (editors). Debrett's Peerage and Baronetage (1990 edition). New York: St Martin's Press, 1990.

External links 

1769 births
1831 deaths
87th (Royal Irish Fusiliers) Regiment of Foot officers
58th Regiment of Foot officers
Members of the Parliament of Great Britain for Welsh constituencies
British MPs 1796–1800
Members of the Parliament of the United Kingdom for Welsh constituencies
UK MPs 1801–1802
UK MPs 1802–1806
UK MPs 1806–1807
UK MPs 1807–1812
UK MPs 1812–1818
Lisburne, E3
3
John